Nicrophorus reichardti is a burying beetle described by V. Kieseritzky in 1930.

References

Silphidae
Beetles of North America
Beetles described in 1930